Darren Edward Kenton (born 13 September 1978) is an English former professional footballer who last played for Rochester Rhinos in the USL First Division.

Career

Norwich City
Kenton was born in Wandsworth and started his career at Norwich City in 1997. He played 158 league games and scored nine goals for the Canaries in the old Football League First Division.

Southampton/Leicester City
Kenton signed for Southampton in 2003 on a free transfer. Kenton scored his only goal for Southampton in an FA Cup match against MK Dons on 7 January 2006.

Having been released by Southampton in May 2006, he joined Leicester City on 27 June 2006, a team for which he had previously had a loan spell in 2005.

He started the 2006–07 Championship season as a first-team regular, despite scoring an own goal against West Bromwich Albion in his sixth game for the club. He struggled with injury towards the end of the season. On 31 March 2007 he scored his first goal for the club in a 4–2 defeat away to Stoke City and got his second of the season in a 2–1 loss against Norwich City on 14 April 2007.

On 19 June 2007 Kenton was placed on the transfer list by then manager Martin Allen. However, the injury of Stephen Clemence and James Wesolowski on 23 October 2007 saw a recall into the senior squad, playing in midfield position. He was regularly involved in the first team in November and December 2007.

Leeds United
On 10 January 2008, Kenton joined League One side Leeds United on a one-month loan deal He then had his Leicester contract terminated by mutual consent on 31 January 2008 and he joined Leeds permanently on the same day. He played 12 games for the club as they finished sixth, but he did not play in their play-off campaign and he was released at the end of the season.

Cheltenham Town
On 2 October 2008, Kenton joined Cheltenham Town, he signed at the same time as former Leicester teammate James Wesolowski and linked up with former Leicester manager Martin Allen. He made 13 league appearances before turning down an extended contract and consequently left the club on 6 January 2009. He scored once for Cheltenham, in a 4–3 win over Colchester United.

Rochester Rhinos
After an unsuccessful trial with Toronto FC in February 2009, Kenton joined Rochester Rhinos on a one-year contract on 9 April.

References

External links
Rochester Rhinos bio

Career information at ex-canaries.co.uk

1978 births
Living people
Norwich City F.C. players
Southampton F.C. players
Leeds United F.C. players
Leicester City F.C. players
Cheltenham Town F.C. players
English footballers
Association football defenders
Premier League players
Rochester New York FC players
USL First Division players
English expatriate sportspeople in the United States
Expatriate soccer players in the United States
English expatriate footballers